Jonah Nabon was a rabbinical scholar; born at Jerusalem in 1713; died there 1760; son of Hanun Nabon.

He was celebrated for his Talmudic and kabbalistic learning, and was the teacher of Chaim Joseph David Azulai (the Chida). Nabon wrote several works, of which only two have been published, namely:
Nechpah ba-Kesef (vol. i, Constantinople, 1748; vol. ii, Jerusalem, 1843), responsa; and
 Get Mekushar, on divorce, in the form of a commentary on "Get Pashut," a work on the same subject by Moses ibn Habib.

References

1713 births
1760 deaths
18th-century rabbis from the Ottoman Empire
Kabbalists
Sephardi Jews in Ottoman Palestine
Rabbis in Jerusalem